Eof (also Eoves) was a swineherd who claimed to have seen a vision of the Virgin Mary at Evesham in England, about 701. Eof related this vision to Egwin, Bishop of Worcester, who founded the great Evesham Abbey on the site of the apparition. Evesham means Eof's ham (homestead).

Legend
The standard Lives, and Saint Egwin and his Abbey of Evesham  say Eof was a swineherd. A letter, apparently written by Ecgwin, says "... primum cuidam pastori gregum ...", and the Acta Sanctorum (Lives of the Saints) states something similar: " ...pastores gregum ..." The Latin means either a shepherd or a herdsman. William Dugdale in Monasticon Anglicanum says "Eoves, a herdsman of the bishop ...". George May, the most eminent of Evesham historians, gives both herdsman and swineherd.

The story that Eof was a swineherd goes back at least to William of Malmesbury, writing in the twelfth century. The obverse of the conventual seal of Evesham Abbey clearly shows stylised pigs rather than sheep; the monks of the Abbey clearly thought Eof kept pigs.

The legend of Eof's vision has been commemorated by a bronze statue sited in the town centre paid for by public subscription and created by the British born sculptor John McKenna.  The statue was unveiled in a public ceremony that took place on Sunday 15 June 2008.

Eof vs. Eoves
The question of whether the swineherd was named Eof or Eoves is a long-standing 
question still argued about today. Writing in 1920 however, the historian O.G. Knapp argued that "It is impossible that Eoves should have been the Swineherd’s name for several reasons. In the first place the letter ‘V’ is not found in the Saxon alphabet, having been brought to this country by the Normans; so that Eofeshamme, given in one of the charters, indicates the older and better form of the name ... But even if Eofes is older and more accurate than Eoves it cannot be the original form of the name. A moment’s reflection will show that if Evesham means the meadow of some person, the name of that person must be in what Grammarians call the Genitive (or Possessive) Case, Singular. This in modern English is nearly always denoted by ’s placed at the end of the word; the apostrophe showing that a vowel has dropped out of the termination. Anglo-Saxon had a larger selection of endings for the Genitive Case, but the one in –es (the original form of our modern ’s) belonged to what are called ‘strong’ Masculine nouns, which usually ended in a consonant. Eofes, therefore, would be the natural Genitive of a man’s proper name, Eof. Ferguson suggests that the original form of the name might have been Eofa, but such a name would correspond to the ‘weak’ nouns which made their Genitive by adding not –es but –an; in which case the name of the town would have been Eofanham, as is shown in the case of Offenham, the Ham of Offa or Uffa. We may therefore take it as certain that the real name of the Swineherd was not Eoves, Eofes, or even Eofa, but Eof."

References

External links
 

Marian visionaries
8th-century English people
7th-century English people